Acleris maccana, the marbled dog's-tooth tortrix, is a moth of the family Tortricidae. The species was first described by Georg Friedrich Treitschke in 1835. It is found from Europe, east across the boreal regions to Siberia. In North America it occurs across much of the boreal forest region, south in the mountains in the east.

The wingspan is 19–25 mm. Adults are on wing in late fall and again in early spring. There is one generation per year.

The larvae feed on deciduous trees and shrubs, including Myrica (including Myrica gale), Vaccinium (including Vaccinium myrtillus and Vaccinium uliginosum), Rhododendron, Malus, Betula, Salix and Populus species. They live between leaves spun together with silk.

External links

maccana
Moths of Asia
Tortricidae of Europe
Moths of North America
Moths described in 1835